The Howrah–Nagpur–Mumbai line (also known as Mumbai–Kolkata line) is a railway line in India connecting Kolkata and Mumbai via Nagpur. The  railway line was opened to traffic in 1900.

Sections
The  trunk line has been treated in more detail in smaller sections:
 Howrah–Kharagpur section
 Kharagpur–Tatanagar section
 Tatanagar–Bilaspur section
 Bilaspur–Nagpur section
 Nagpur–Bhusawal section
 Bhusawal–Kalyan section
 Kalyan–Mumbai CST section

Geography
The Howrah–Nagpur–Mumbai line cuts across the central parts of India in an east–west direction and traverses the plains of lower West Bengal, the southern part of Chota Nagpur Plateau, the Deccan Plateau, the Western Ghats and finally the Western Coastal Plains.

History

While the entire Mumbai–Nagpur line was  broad gauge, the next part from Nagpur to Rajnandgaon was metre gauge. The Nagpur Chhattisgarh Railway started construction of the  Nagpur–Rajnandgaon section in 1878, after surveys were started in 1871. The Nagpur–Tumsar Road section was opened in April 1880 and the Tumsar Road–Rajnandgaon section in December 1880.

The GIPR and EIR, working jointly, completed the Howrah–Allahabad–Mumbai line thereby establishing a connection between Kolkata and Mumbai in 1870. The great famine of 1878 was an impetus for the fast completion of the Nagpur Chhattisgarh Railway track, but by then the idea of a route from Mumbai to Kolkata, shorter than the one via Allahabad, had set in.

The Bengal Nagpur Railway was formed in 1871. Amongst its major objectives were taking over of the Nagpur Chhattisgarh Railway and its conversion to broad gauge and extension of its system by a  line to Asansol on EIR's main line. The entire task was completed by 1891 and Nagpur was connected to Asansol. However, the line via Asansol was never seriously used as a link to Howrah for passenger traffic.

The Sini–Kharagpur–Kolaghat line was opened in 1898–99. The Kolaghat–Howrah section was completed in 1899–1900. The entire line was opened with the completion of the bridge across the  Rupnarayan River, near Kolaghat, on 19 April 1900.

Electrification
The entire line is electrified.

Speed limits
The entire Howrah–Nagpur–Mumbai line is classified as a "Group A" line which can take speeds up to 160 kmph but speed is restricted to 130 kmph for some sections and rest are under 110 kmph.

Passenger movement

Golden Quadrilateral
The Howrah–Nagpur–Mumbai line is a part of the Golden Quadrilateral. The routes connecting the four major metropolises (New Delhi, Mumbai, Chennai and Kolkata), along with their diagonals, known as the Golden Quadrilateral, carry about half the freight and nearly half the passenger traffic, although they form only 16 per cent of the length.

References

External links

|

5 ft 6 in gauge railways in India
Rail transport in West Bengal
Rail transport in Jharkhand
Rail transport in Odisha
Rail transport in Chhattisgarh
Rail transport in Maharashtra